The Ocotillo Formation is a Pliocene fluvial-alluvial fan geologic formation in the Colorado Desert of Southern California.

It occurs in western Imperial County and eastern San Diego County.

Geology
The formation overlies the Brawley Formation and the Palm Spring Formation. In the Mecca Hills, it is younger than 765,000 years.

Fossils
It preserves fossils and petrified wood, from the Pliocene Epoch of the Neogene Period, within Anza-Borrego Desert State Park.

See also

 
 List of fossiliferous stratigraphic units in California
 Paleontology in California

References

Further reading
 
 

Geologic formations of California
Pliocene California
Colorado Desert
Geology of Imperial County, California
Geology of San Diego County, California
Anza-Borrego Desert State Park